John Downey Works (March 29, 1847June 6, 1928) was an American politician and lawyer. He was a U.S. Senator representing California from 1911 to 1917, and an associate justice of the California Supreme Court from October 2, 1888, to January 5, 1891.

Biography
Works was born in Ohio County, Indiana, and attended public schools there. During the American Civil War, he served as a member of the 10th Regiment of the Indiana Cavalry. Once discharged, he returned home, read law and in 1868 was admitted to the Indiana bar. In November 1878, he was elected as a representative in the Indiana General Assembly, serving during the 1879 term. In June 1883, he published a book of practice, pleading and forms to match the revised code of Indiana.

In 1883, Works's poor health forced a move to San Diego, California, where he became active in the Republican Party, and rose in California politics. In September 1886, he ran on the Republican ticket, and prior to the election was appointed by Governor Robert Waterman as a judge of the San Diego County Superior Court. In September 1887, he resigned to return to private practice, and Governor Waterman appointed Edwin Parker to fill the vacant seat.

In 1888, Governor Waterman appointed Works as an associate justice of the California Supreme Court to fill a vacancy after the resignation of Elisha W. McKinstry. In August 1888, the Republican Party nominated Works and he was elected to the remaining portion of McKinstry's term ending January 5, 1891. In 1891, after stepping down from the bench, Works became president of the San Diego Sun company, and then returned to private practice with his son in the firm of Works & Works in San Diego.

In January 1896, Works moved to Los Angeles, California. On December 7, 1909, he was elected as a council member of the Los Angeles City Council, and chosen as its president, but he resigned shortly after on March 22, 1910.

In 1911, Works was elected to the U.S. Senate, where he served on the committee on Expenditures in the War Department (Sixty-second United States Congress) and the Committee on Fisheries. In February 1917, he and other Progressive Senators, under the moniker "twelve willful men," blocked by filibuster legislation empowering President Woodrow Wilson to arm merchant vessels prior to the United States entering World War I.

After retiring from the Senate he wrote two books: (1919) Duty to Man: A Study of Social Conditions and How They May Be Improved and (1922) What's Wrong With the World?

On June 6, 1928, he died in Los Angeles and his ashes were placed in Inglewood Park Cemetery.

Personal life
On November 7, 1868, he married Alice Banta, in Vevay, Indiana, and they had two sons, Thomas L. and Louis R., who became an attorney and practiced with his father, and later the presiding justice of the Court of Appeal, Second Division; as well as five daughters: Josephine (who died as an infant), Ida, Laura, Ethel and Isabel. He is said to have been a member of the Church of Christ, Scientist.

Notes

Selected publications
 Works, John D. (1919). Man's Duty to Man: A Study of Social Conditions and How They May Be Improved. New York: Neale Publishing Co.
 Online books by John D. Works. Library of the University of Pennsylvania.

External links

 Guide to the John D. Works Papers at The Bancroft Library
 John D. Works. California Supreme Court Historical Society. 
 John D. Works v. Superior Court, 130 Cal. 304, 62 P. 507 (Cal. 1900).
 Past & Present Justices. California State Courts. Retrieved July 19, 2017.

1847 births
1928 deaths
People from Rising Sun, Indiana
American Christian Scientists
California Republicans
Republican Party United States senators from California
Justices of the Supreme Court of California
Superior court judges in the United States
U.S. state supreme court judges admitted to the practice of law by reading law
19th-century American judges
19th-century American lawyers
20th-century American lawyers
19th-century American politicians
20th-century American politicians
Politicians from San Diego
Presidents of the Los Angeles City Council
People of Indiana in the American Civil War
Union Army soldiers
Burials at Inglewood Park Cemetery
California state court judges